The Women's Declaration International (WDI), formerly the Women's Human Rights Campaign (WHRC), is an advocacy group founded in the United Kingdom with presence in many other countries. The group is known for publishing a declaration on "sex-based rights" and has said that "transgenderism" is in breach of article 5 of the UN convention on eliminating discrimination against women and girls, because "the practice of transgenderism clearly falls under the article because it is based on stereotypical roles for men and women". It has been described as anti-trans, trans-exclusionary, trans-exclusionary radical feminist (TERF) and as a hate group.

History and views
The Women's Human Rights Campaign (WHRC) was founded in 2019 by a group of women including Maureen O'Hara, Sheila Jeffreys and Heather Brunskell-Evans. Brunskell-Evans had been sacked from the Women's Equality Party the previous year as a result of her views on transgender people, Jeffreys has said, "Radical feminist theorists do not seek to make gender a bit more flexible, but to eliminate it. They are gender abolitionists, and understand gender to provide the framework and rationale for male dominance. In the radical feminist approach, masculinity is the behaviour of the male ruling class and femininity is the behaviour of the subordinate class of women. Thus gender can have no place in the egalitarian future that feminism aims to create." In March 2018 Jeffreys said: "when men claim to be women…and parasitically occupy the bodies of the oppressed, they speak for the oppressed. They become to be recognised as the oppressed. There’s no space for women’s liberation."

The group describes itself as a "female-only" group and says it aims to "lobby nations to maintain language protecting women and girls on the basis of sex rather than gender or gender identity". In December 2021, the group changed its name to "Women's Declaration International".

According to Vice the group has promoted conspiracy theories and false information. The Association for Women's Rights in Development (AWID) has described WHRC as a trojan horse in human rights spaces and argued that WHRC "engages in sensationalism and fear-mongering" to "undermine and water down the progressions of human rights standards that protect the rights of trans and gender non-conforming persons," and that WDI promotes "extreme anti-trans misinformation." AWID and the Trans Safety Network have both described WHRC/WDI as "an extreme anti-trans group". Scottish Women's Aid described WHRC as a group "seeking to stigmatise and discriminate against trans women". Equity Forward discussed WHRC in the context of the Trump administration's "anti-human rights multilateralism" and described it as anti-trans. The Canadian Anti-Hate Network described WHRC as a "TERF project". Fascism scholar  writes that WDI’s "extremist" positions have "isolated the WDI from wider international feminism and brought them into strategic coalitions with conservative and extreme right organizations."

For International Women's Day in 2021, WHRC Norway (now WDI Norway) proposed the slogans "No to heresy in primary schools, girls and women do not have a penis" and "Only women are women," that were accused of being hateful and transphobic by the established feminist organizations. Christine Marie Jentoft, an advisor on gender diversity at the Norwegian Organisation for Sexual and Gender Diversity, described WHRC as a hate group that works to deprive transgender people of autonomy and rights. Gender studies professor  described the group's Norwegian branch as anti-gender and part of a "complex threat to democracy" that "represent[s] a reactionary populist backlash to basic human rights principles," and that seeks to "demonize the very basics of trans existence." In 2022 Norwegian police opened a criminal investigation of the leader of WDI Norway, Christina Eline Ellingsen, who is accused of violating section 185 on hate speech in the Norwegian Penal Code.

In June 2022 several groups opposing trans rights, including WDI USA, Alliance Defending Freedom, Family Research Council and Women's Liberation Front, organized a rally called "Our Bodies, Our Sports" in Washington D.C. The American Independent noted that some of the organizers, but not WDI, are designated as hate groups by the Southern Poverty Law Center, and Lindsay Schubiner, an expert on extremism, said: "There has been a clear increase in organizing to promote anti-LGBTQ and specifically anti-trans bigotry and I think that we can see that trend line moving up. This event in particular looks like an attempt to legitimize and elevate and spread their transphobia and especially to build political power around specific anti-trans policy goals." The article also noted that WDI had tweeted in support of abortion rights.

Declaration on Women's Sex-Based Rights 
The group is known for publishing the Declaration on Women's Sex-Based Rights, co-authored by Jeffreys and Brunskell-Evans, which called for the "elimination" of "the practice of transgenderism" and for the UK to repeal the Gender Recognition Act. Emma Ritch, executive director of the feminist policy organisation Engender, said that "when [the declaration] talks about violence against women, freedom of expression, and children's rights it does so entirely through the warped lens of antipathy towards trans people". She further said that WHRC appears to see "rights as a rhetorical device with which to stigmatise minority groups". The declaration was described by the Equality Network as anti-trans, by the Scottish Trans Alliance as focused "almost entirely on denying the reality of trans people's lives" and as transphobic. The Association for Women's Rights in Development said that the declaration co-opts the "Convention on the Elimination of all Forms of Discrimination Against Women (CEDAW) framework to claim that 'sex' is an immutable category and 'gender' is not a legitimate concept", and that the sex-based' rhetoric misuses concepts of sex and gender to push a deeply discriminatory agenda". Legal scholar and human rights expert Sandra Duffy described the declaration's concept of "sex-based rights" as "a fiction with the pretense of legality". Kathleen Stock, who resigned from her position at the University of Sussex following accusations of transphobia, had been criticised by student protesters for signing WHRC's declaration. WHRC subsequently released a joint statement together with the Women's Liberation Front in support of Stock.

See also

LGB Alliance

References

External links
 
Organisations that oppose transgender rights in the United Kingdom
Advocacy groups in the United Kingdom
2019 establishments in England
Mildenhall, Suffolk
Organisations based in Suffolk